Heterogyrus milloti is a species of beetle in the family Gyrinidae, the only species in the genus Heterogyrus. It is endemic to Madagascar, and forms a basal lineage within the family, estimated to have diverged from all other gyrinids (aside from the even earlier branching Spanglerogyrus) 200 million years ago. It is suggested to be closely related to the fossil genera Mesogyrus, Cretotortor and Baissogyrus which constitute the subfamily Heterogyrinae.

References

Gyrinidae
Monotypic Adephaga genera